Gage Skidmore (born May 16, 1993) is an American photographer and Creative Commons contributor. He is known for photographing American public figures, most commonly politicians and Hollywood actors. His work has been used by publications including The Washington Post, The New Republic, The Atlantic, the Associated Press, and NPR.

Early life
Skidmore was born in Terre Haute, Indiana, on May 16, 1993. He attended high school there and later moved to Arizona, where he joined Glendale Community College in Glendale and Arizona State University in Phoenix. As of October 2021, he continues to reside in Phoenix.

Career

Skidmore began taking photographs in March 2009 at the San Diego Comic Con. The following year, he photographed politicians at events organized by Rand Paul's campaign during the 2010 Senate election in Kentucky. He had supported Rand Paul's father Ron during his 2008 bid for president. During Ron Paul's 2012 presidential bid, Skidmore took a year off school to photograph Paul and several other prominent Republicans.

Skidmore is one of the most widely published political photographers in the United States. During the 2016 presidential election, his photographs were used by The Atlantic, The Washington Post, the Associated Press, and NPR, as well as on the official website of presidential candidate Donald Trump.

Skidmore has also photographed Hollywood celebrities at pop culture conventions, such as Sandra Bullock, Tom Cruise, Samuel L. Jackson, Angelina Jolie, and Bruce Willis, with a large percentage of Hollywood actors' Wikipedia pages sporting a photograph taken by him at said conventions. It is estimated that his photographs have been reposted over 1 million times, and a Priceonomics study showed that he has posted nearly 40,000 photographs of presidential candidates and celebrities to Flickr since 2010, with his Flickr account being linked to over 30 million times.

In addition to his Creative Commons work, Skidmore has been commissioned as a photographer by National School Choice Week, Western Journalism, the Conservative Review, and Reason magazine.

References

External links

 

1993 births
Living people
21st-century American photographers
Arizona State University alumni
Photographers from Arizona
Photographers from Indiana
People from Peoria, Arizona
People from Terre Haute, Indiana
Wikimedia image contributors